The Grand Prix du Portugal was a cycling race held annually in Portugal. It is part of the UCI Europe Tour in category 2.ncup, as it was part of the UCI Under 23 Nations' Cup.

Winners

References

Cycle races in Portugal
UCI Europe Tour races
Recurring sporting events established in 2007
Recurring sporting events disestablished in 2010
2007 establishments in Portugal
Defunct sports competitions in Portugal
Spring (season) events in Portugal
Defunct cycling races in Portugal